Plaza Frontenac is an upscale, two-level, enclosed, regional shopping center in Frontenac, Missouri. Opened in 1974 and anchored by Saks Fifth Avenue and Neiman Marcus, it has high-end tenants, many of which are unique to the region. Since 2018, Plaza Frontenac has been owned by a joint venture between Canada Pension Plan Investment Board and Brookfield Properties.

Tenants

Plaza Frontenac has a mix of specialty stores, beauty services, home goods, and apparel. The mall is anchored by Saks Fifth Avenue and Neiman Marcus, making it one of nine malls in the US to have both department stores as anchors.

Other retailers include mostly national brands such as Allen Edmonds, Coach, Eileen Fisher, J. Crew, Kate Spade, Louis Vuitton, Lululemon Athletica, L'Occitane en Provence, MAC Cosmetics, Michael Kors, Omega SA, Talbots, Tiffany & Co., Tory Burch, Tumi, UNTUCKit, Vineyard Vines, and Williams Sonoma.

Restaurants at Plaza Frontenac include four out-parcel lots and range from casual to fine dining; restaurants include Canyon Cafe, Cardwell's at the Plaza, BRIO! Tuscan Grille, BrickTop's, Fleming's Prime Steakhouse & Wine Bar, and Zodiac Room at Neiman Marcus.

The shopping center also features Landmark Plaza Frontenac Cinema, a six-screen theater that frequently features independent and limited-release films.

Location
Plaza Frontenac is located in the affluent, first-ring St. Louis suburb Frontenac off of Highway 64 and South Lindbergh Boulevard. It is roughly 12 miles from downtown St. Louis and two-and-a-half miles from the Saint Louis Country Club. It is considered part of the "Mid-County" area, but borders "West County," which is known for its wealthy, second-ring suburbs and for attracting professional athletes and celebrities. These communities include Clarkson Valley, Chesterfield, Ladue, and Creve Coeur, Missouri. General Growth Properties reports the trade area as having a current population of 376,833 and a current average household income of approximately $110,000.

History
Plaza Frontenac, designed to resemble a colonial style building, opened in 1974. Developed by a local real estate development company, its location and development was chosen in part because of the affluent surrounding areas. Saks Fifth Avenue, which had a store in Central West End St. Louis since the early 1950s, relocated its St. Louis store to the Plaza Frontenac location in 1973. Neiman Marcus, as part of a national expansion, signed on to anchor the project as well. In addition to the luxury retailers that could be found, it also became known for its opulent design. It featured fountains, wooden floors, and prominent staircases at each end.

It was first extensively remodeled in 1994. Facing competition from St. Louis Galleria, which opened in 1984 and was expanded in 1992, Plaza Frontenac's new owners hired Michael Mindlin and David Suttle, of Hellmuth, Obata, & Kassabaum, who developed a merchandising strategy for the re-positioning and renovation of Plaza Frontenac that resulted in a new mix of day spa, art theater, white-tablecloth restaurants (facing outward to create a whole new arrival experience) and home goods that retained the mature, affluent shopper, but also attracted a younger, more diverse customer.  The re-positioning was based on a new sense of hospitality that started a small revolution in shopping center design by creating a resort approach to modern retailing environments. Mindlin and Suttle continued to work with the ownership refining this concept over the next decade as Suttle Mindlin, an internationally recognized strategic planning and design firm.  According to the Urban Land Institute “the renovation puts Plaza Frontenac on the cutting edge of mall design.”  Based upon this merchandising and lifestyle strategy, the facility gave back a $150-square-foot increase of in-line sales at the end of the first year of operations after the renovation.  The design created a sense of relaxed hospitality, including landscaping (inside and out), new hardwood floors and paint, as well as furniture and fixtures, and LED lighting. Frontenac now boasts "hand-made custom carpets. imported European furniture in soft seating areas," a grand piano with live music and renewed services and amenities including opulent women's restrooms and lounge with individual wood-lined restrooms.  The anchor tenant to the re-branding was Cardwell's, a local restaurant that was selected by Mindlin and Suttle to be the anchor tenant and secured by the Ownership.  Mindlin and Suttle designed Cardwell's at the Plaza as an entirely new lifestyle offering where patrons could show up in sweats or a suit.  Plaza Frontenac became the "town center" of this affluent community and set a new standard for retailing.'"

By 2010, the property was owned by Davis Street Landing Company, which added two outparcel restaurants to the center, despite national economic conditions that were causing malls across the country to struggle. With the addition of the two outparcels, the total square footage increased to 482,843 and included roughly 40 tenants.

In September 2011, Davis Street Properties sold Plaza Frontenac to a joint venture between General Growth Properties and Canada Pension Plan Investment Board. At the time it was reported that average sales at the center were approximately $500 per square foot, well above the national average. It was also 96% leased beyond the anchors.

During this same time it was noted in the local media that many local tenants were leaving only to be replaced by national chains. Openings toward the end of the year included Madewell and Athleta.

In early 2014, GGP announced three new stores would be opening: Forever Flawless, a skincare store, in mid-year, Tory Burch in August, and upscale home goods store Mitchell Gold + Bob Wilson Signature Store by the end of the year, near the Christmas season. The mall has also recently announced that jeweler David Yurman is joining the growing roster of upscale, national retailers. Prep sportswear retailer Vineyard Vines has also announced it will be opening its first Missouri store at Plaza Frontenac with an anticipated November opening.  Additionally, Louis Vuitton underwent a renovation and expansion. GGP also reported that tenant sales in 2013 increased to $564 per square foot.

In popular culture
Native St. Louis rappers Chingy and Nelly have both made references to Plaza Frontenac in their music. In "Ride wit Me", Nelly raps,  "Face and body Frontenac, don't know how to act."  Amongst other references in his songs, Chingy's "Right Thurr" contains the phrase, "She be shopping in Frontenac."

References

External links
Plaza Frontenac

Buildings and structures in St. Louis County, Missouri
Brookfield Properties
Shopping malls in Missouri
Tourist attractions in St. Louis County, Missouri
Shopping malls established in 1974
1974 establishments in Missouri